The discography of the Lumineers, an American folk rock band, consists of four studio albums, seven extended plays, 19 singles, five promotional singles and 19 music videos. In 2011, the Lumineers released a self-recorded extended play. The release of the EP and extensive touring brought the group to the attention of Dualtone Records, which signed them in 2012.

The Lumineers then worked extensively with producer Ryan Hadlock in recording their self-titled debut studio album, which was released in April 2012. The album reached number two on the United States Billboard 200 and the top ten of the Australian, Canadian and United Kingdom album charts – it was certified platinum by the Recording Industry Association of America (RIAA) and Music Canada (MC). Three singles, "Ho Hey", "Stubborn Love" and "Submarines" were released from the album: "Ho Hey" peaked at number three on the US Billboard Hot 100 and was certified platinum by the RIAA.

Studio albums

Extended plays

Singles

Promotional singles

Other charted songs

Other appearances

Notes

Music videos

References

External links
 
 
 The Lumineers at Rate Your Music
 

Discography
Alternative rock discographies
Discographies of American artists